Alan or Allan Bell may refer to:
Alan J. W. Bell (born 1937), British television producer and director
Alan Bell (cricketer), English cricketer who played for Hertfordshire
Alan E. Bell, American technologist
Alan Bell (athlete) (born 1957), British Olympic athlete
Allan Bell (born 1947), Chief Minister of the Isle of Man and Member of the House of Keys for Ramsey
Allan Bell (sociolinguist) (born 1947), sociolinguistic researcher in New Zealand
Alan P. Bell (1932–2002), American psychologist who studied homosexuality
Alan Edward Bell, American film editor
Allan Gordon Bell (born 1953), Canadian composer